Raziabad (also Romanized as Raẕīābād, Razīābād, and Rizaābād) is a village in Basharyat-e Gharbi Rural District, Basharyat District, Abyek County, Qazvin Province, Iran. At the 2006 census, its population was 364, in 81 families.

References 

Populated places in Abyek County